Sannick Family Farm is a national historic district and historic family farm located at South Oxford in Chenango County, New York. The district includes four contributing buildings, one contributing site, and two contributing structures. They include the farmhouse, corncrib / granary, bank barn, silo, and milk house.

It was added to the National Register of Historic Places in 2007.

References

Farms on the National Register of Historic Places in New York (state)
Historic districts on the National Register of Historic Places in New York (state)
Historic districts in Chenango County, New York
National Register of Historic Places in Chenango County, New York